Lost in Los Angeles (LiLA) is an American indie and alternative rock music band formed in Los Angeles, California in 2006. They received the 35th Annual Telly Award in New York City for Best Music Video, "Million Stars" which aired on MTV, VH1, and Spike.

iTunes Billboard Chart
2013 - Lost in Los Angeles, lead singer Danny Klein collaborated with label-mate and rapper Really Doe on the track “Mesmerized” on Doe’s 2009 record “First Impressions” which debuted at #6 on the iTunes Hip Hop/Rap charts.

Concert tours 

2013 - JVC Mobile Entertainment Plugged-In U.S. Tour  – The five-week national tour covered 28 cities across the United States. Lost in Los Angeles toured with bands ‘Girl on Fire’ and ‘AngelsFall'.
2013 -  East Coast Radio & Club Tour  - The band took a mini-tour to the east coast tri-state area New York, New Jersey, and Philadelphia. The band performed at various radio stations and played shows at Fontana’s Club in New York City, The Hard Rock in Philadelphia and Mexicali Live in Teaneck, New Jersey.
2014 -  SXSW 2014  - The band went on the road performing a string of five shows at South By Southwest, Austin, TX.

Record labels 

2013 - Spark Farm Records
2007 - 2013 - Griffin Guess, Cartel Records

Albums 

2014 -  LOVE IS FATE  (LP)
2014 -  CLOUD CITY  (SINGLES & B-SIDES) 
2013 -  BURNIN  (December Sessions Remix)
2013 -  BECAUSE OF YOU  (RADIO EDIT & B-SIDES)
2013 -  THE HOVERING  (EP)
2012 - "DAYBREAK" (Single) 
2010 -  LILA  (LP)

Awards and accolades 
2006 - 35th Annual Telly Award Winner for Best Music Video, Million Stars.

References

External links 
 

Alternative rock groups from California
Musical groups from Los Angeles
Caroline Records artists
Musical groups established in 2006
Musical quartets
American musical trios
Articles which contain graphical timelines